The Wenhua Film Company was a Chinese major privately owned film production company headquartered in Shanghai, China. It was founded in 1946 and defunct in 1952 of the immediate post-war period in China.

History 
The film company was founded in 1946 by Wu Xingzai, a businessman who had previously controlled assets of the Lianhua Film Company during the mid-1930s. With Wenhua, Wu desired to have a film studio devoted to making smaller-budget art films, sophisticated comedies, and high-minded dramas. These films often focused on contemporary social issues such as feminism and adaptations of Western literature. These included Night Inn (1947), an adaptation of Maxim Gorky's The Lower Depths, and starring Zhou Xuan. but also comedies such as the Sang Hu-Eileen Chang collaboration, Long Live the Missus! (1947). During this early period, however, the company is perhaps best known as the producer of Fei Mu's masterpiece, Spring in a Small Town (1948).

Like other private studios, notably Kunlun Film Company, Wenhua continued in operation after the Communist takeover, putting out several films with the popular actor-director Shi Hui, including This Life of Mine (1950) (based on a novella by Lao She), Corruption (1950) (based on a work by Mao Dun), and the war film Platoon Commander Guan (1951). Yet many of these postwar films, particularly 1950's Peaceful Spring, were also criticized as hewing too close to Wenhua's pre-Communist humanist tradition. By 1952, Shi Hui had fallen out of the Party's favor, and Wenhua, like the other remaining private studios in Shanghai, was consolidated under state ownership.

Notable films

References

Sources 
 Brown, Jeremy & Pickowicz, Paul. Dilemmas of Victory: The Early Years of the People's Republic of China. Harvard University Press, 2007. .
 Zhang, Yingjin. Chinese National Cinema. Routledge, 2004. .

External links 
Wenhua Film Company at the British Film Institute

Film production companies of China
Defunct film and television production companies of China
Mass media companies established in 1946
Mass media in Shanghai
Companies based in Shanghai
Mass media companies disestablished in 1952
1952 disestablishments in China
Chinese companies established in 1946